Interleukin-1 receptor-associated kinase 1 (IRAK-1) is an enzyme in humans encoded by the IRAK1 gene. IRAK-1 plays an important role in the regulation of the expression of inflammatory genes by immune cells, such as monocytes and macrophages, which in turn help the immune system in eliminating bacteria, viruses, and other pathogens. IRAK-1 is part of the IRAK family consisting of IRAK-1, IRAK-2, IRAK-3, and IRAK-4, and is activated by inflammatory molecules released by signaling pathways during pathogenic attack. IRAK-1 is classified as a kinase enzyme, which regulates pathways in both innate and adaptive immune systems.

Structure 
IRAK-1 contains an N-terminal death domain (DD), a ProST domain, a centrally located kinase domain, and a C-terminal domain. The DD on IRAK-1 acts as an interaction platform for other DD-containing protein, most notably the adaptor protein myeloid differentiation factor 88, MyD88.

The proST domain contains serine, proline, and threonine amino acid residues and is used to facilitate IRAK-1 interaction with other IRAK family members or proteins. For example, auto-phosphorylation may occur multiple times in the ProST domain, which allows IRAK-1 to dissociate from the MyD88 bound to the DD while maintaining interactions with downstream proteins such as TNF receptor-associated factor 6 (TRAF-6) to initiate further pathway signaling.

Moreover, IRAK-1 contains an invariant lysine within the centrally located kinase domain. The invariant lysine acts as a binding site for ATP and a mediator for catalytic function and kinase activity.

IRAK-1 also contains a tyrosine residue (Tyr262) that conformationally changes the active site of the IRAK-1 by inhibiting the hydrophilic pocket behind the binding site and thereby allows the IRAK-1 to remain in an active state. For example, ATP binding to the IRAK-1 binding site can readily occur in the presence of Tyr266, because Tyr266 will occupy the hydrophilic pocket where ATP competitive inhibitors may bind and disrupt catalytic function.

Activation 
In the presence of foreign pathogens, IRAK-1 induced signaling pathways can be activated by Toll-like receptors (TLRs) or by interleukin-1 family receptors (IL-1R) in response. TLRs recognize pathogen-associated molecular patterns (PAMPs) expressed on bacteria and IL-1Rs recognize and bind pro-inflammatory cytokines of the IL-1 family. Both the TLR and IL-1R mediate a signaling cascade that involves MyD88 binding to the receptor, oligomerization of the MyD88, recruitment of IRAK-1 via the DD, multimerization of IRAK-1, and ultimately kinase activation and further downstream signaling.

IRAK-1 can also be activated upon interaction with other IRAK family members. IRAK-1 and IRAK-4 can activate each other by using the DD as a platform for MyD88. IRAK-4 first phosphorylates IRAK-1 which catalyzes an IRAK-1 auto-phosphorylation cascade, occurring in three steps. IRAK-1 is first phosphorylated at Thr209, causing a conformational change. Then, IRAK-1 is phosphorylated at Thr387 rendering IRAK-1 fully active. Finally, auto-phosphorylation at several residues in the proST region stimulates IRAK-1 release from the receptor complex.

Function 

The IRAK-1 encodes the interleukin-1 receptor-associated kinase 1, which is a serine-threonine protein kinase that is associated with the interleukin-1 receptor (IL1R) upon stimulation. IRAK-1 is required for pro-inflammatory cytokine production downstream of TLR and IL-1R signaling pathways. Moreover, IRAK-1 is responsible for IL1-induced up-regulation of the transcriptional factor NF-kappa B. Upon binding with its receptor, IRAK-1 becomes activated, as described in Activation, and then dissociates from its receptor complex. IRAK-1 dissociates from the receptor alongside of TRAF6 - a ubiquitin E3 ligase that intermediates between various types of receptors for exogenous or endogenous mediators and activation of transcriptional responses via NF-kappa B and MAPK pathways.  IRAK-1 and TRAF-6 then bind to TAK-1 binding protein-1 (TAB-1), followed by binding to transforming growth factor-β-activated kinase (TAK-1) and TAB-2, forming a new complex. This complex then translocates into the cytoplasm wherein it associates with ubiquitin ligases such as ubiquitin conjugating enzyme-13 UBC-13 and ubiquitin conjugating enzyme E2 variant-1(UEV-1a), leading to the ubiquitination and degradation of TRAF-6. TAK-1 is then activated and phosphorylation of the inhibitor of κB kinase (IKK) complex, consisting of IKKα, IKKβ, and IKKγ, occurs. MAPKs are also activated in the process. Finally, NF-κB is activated to regulate the transcription of pro-inflammatory genes. Alternatively, IRAK-1 activation of the NF-κB pathway can be regulated by the ubiquitination of Lys134 and Lys180.

Alternatively spliced transcript variants encoding different isoforms have been found for the IRAK1 gene. Currently, there are three differentially spliced variants of IRAK1 - IRAK1, IRAK1b, and IRAK1c. IRAK1 was observed to undergo sumoylation, promoting its translocation to the nucleus instead of the cytoplasm upon pathogenic attack. IRAK1c, notably, remains stable upon sumoylation, does not undergo modification under the same circumstances and localizes only to the cytoplasm.

IRAK-1 kinase activity is not the sole protein involved in pro-inflammatory immune responses, however, it serves as an adaptor protein that effectively binds MyD88, IRAK-4, the toll-interacting proteins (TOLLIP) together to form a complex that induces IL-1R-mediated NF-κB activation.

Regulation 
IRAK-1 activity is regulated during its activation and function. Auto-phosphorylation plays a role in IRAK-1 activation (see Activation), and also mediates proteasome-mediated degradation which results in the loss of the IRAK1 protein. Alternatively, IRAK-1 may be regulated on the transcriptional level. The IRAK-1b splice variant lacks kinase activity and is resistant to proteasome-mediated degradation. Moreover, IRAK-1c splice variant has a truncated and thus mutated sequence at the C-terminus of its kinase domain and acts a negative regulator of the TLR and IL-1R signaling pathways.

Interactions 

IRAK1 has been shown to interact with the following proteins:

 CHUK 
 IKBKG 
 IKK2, 
 Myd88 
 NEMO
 SOCS1
 STAT3
 TRAF6
 UBC,
 TOLLIP
 TLR4

Clinical significance 
IRAK-1 signaling is involved in rheumatoid arthritis. Moreover, IRAK-1 plays a significant role in cancer.

References

Further reading 

 
 
 
 
 
 
 
 
 
 
 
 
 
 
 
 
 

EC 2.7.11